This article currently only has information about the French Fifth Republic.

Political party strength under Fifth Republic 

The following table indicates the great officers in the French Republic :
 President of the Republic
 President of the Senate
 Prime minister
 President of the National Assembly

The table also indicates the historical party composition in the :
 Senate
 National Assembly
 Regional Council
 General Council

Notes

See also
Government and politics in France
Politics of France

Politics of France
Government of France